HMS Valerian was an  sloop of the Royal Navy, built by Charles Rennoldson and Company, South Shields, and launched 21 February 1916. After service in the First World War, she was assigned with sister ships to the America and West Indies Station, based at the Royal Naval Dockyard on Ireland Island in the Imperial fortress colony of Bermuda, where she arrived on the 2nd of April, 1921. She foundered off Bermuda in the 1926 Havana–Bermuda hurricane, on 22 October 1926.

History 
After the commissioning, the Valerian completed security tasks off the British east coast, being used in 1917 and 1918 mainly to monitor coastal convoy routes and the mine barriers of the North Sea Mine Barrage. The sloop was not involved in combat operations, although it was briefly suspected that the she had sunk the German submarine  in the northern North Sea in July 1917. However, this submarine was sunk by the British submarine .

Loss 
HMS Valerian, under her Captain, Commander W. A. Usher, was returning to the HMD Bermuda from providing hurricane relief in the Bahamas (her second post-hurricane mission of mercy to the British West Indies that autumn), trailed by another hurricane. A shortage of coal in the Bahamas had forced her to put to sea with only enough to complete her journey, which meant that her mass, and hence her displacement, was a great deal less than would normally be the case, reducing her stability in rough seas. She last radioed after sighting Gibb's Hill Lighthouse early in the morning of the 22 October 1926, at which time the crew saw no sign of an approaching storm. By the time she reached the Five Fathom Hole, she was being overtaken by the storm and conditions were too rough to risk the channel through the reefs. The crew were forced to turn southward to obtain sea room from the reefline lest they be driven on the rocks, and headed directly into the storm. She fought the storm for more than five hours, but after the eye passed overhead conditions became more dangerous with the wind more powerful and no longer coming from the same direction as the sea. As the ship's Captain, Commander William Arthur Usher, described at the Court Martial:

 The ship sank with most of her crew going overboard without lifeboats or rafts. Men clung to floating wreckage. The Captain was one of 28 on or clinging to a raft. 

In all, 85 of her crew were lost with the Valerian. The British merchant ship Eastway was also sunk near Bermuda. The Royal Naval Dockyard was being hammered and never took its anemometer down. It measured  at 13:00 UTC, before the wind destroyed it. This roughly coincided with the moment Valerian was overwhelmed.

The report of the court martial of the survivors of the Valerian included survivors' descriptions of her loss:

MEMBERS OF THE COURT.
The Court was composed of: -
Captain A. B. Cunningham, D.S.O., Chief of Staff, North America and West Indies Station, H.M.S. Calcutta;
Captain A. T. Tillard, D.S.O., H.M.S. Malabar.
Captain H. D. Bridges, D.S.O., H.M.S. Curlew.
Captain A. M. Lecky, D.S.O., H.M.S. Colombo.
Commander H. B. Maltby, H.M.S. Calcutta.
Captain O. H. Dawson, H.M.S. Capetown, was Prosecutor, and Paymaster-Commander G. H. DeDenne, D.S.O., H.M.S. Calcutta (Admiral's Secretary), was Deputy Judge Advocate.
Commander W.A. Usher, who was in command of the Valerian, Lieutenant F. G. Hughes, Navigator, and the other 17 members of the crew who were saved, attended the Court as the accused.

Among its findings, the Court determined "that there was no error in navigation. Nothing the Commanding Officer could do would have diverted the loss of the ship, and that no blame is attributable to the survivors whose conduct throughout was exemplary", and "The Court is of opinion that none of the survivors are to blame and formally acquits them".

References

World War I sloops of the United Kingdom
Arabis-class sloops
1916 ships
Shipwrecks of Bermuda
Maritime incidents in 1926
Bermuda